The United States Court of Appeals for the Second Circuit (in case citations, 2d Cir.) is one of the thirteen United States Courts of Appeals. Its territory comprises the states of Connecticut, New York and Vermont. The court has appellate jurisdiction over the district courts in the following districts:

 District of Connecticut
 Eastern District of New York
 Northern District of New York
 Southern District of New York
 Western District of New York
 District of Vermont

The Second Circuit has its clerk's office and judges hear oral arguments at the Thurgood Marshall United States Courthouse at 40 Foley Square in Lower Manhattan. Due to renovations at that building, from 2006 until early 2013, the court temporarily relocated to the Daniel Patrick Moynihan United States Courthouse across Pearl Street from Foley Square; certain court offices temporarily relocated to the Woolworth Building at 233 Broadway.

Because the Second Circuit includes New York City, it has long been one of the largest and most influential American federal appellate courts, especially in matters of contract law, securities law, and antitrust law. In the 20th century, it came to be considered one of the two most prestigious federal appellate courts, along with the District of Columbia Circuit Court. Several notable judges have served on the Second Circuit, including three later named Associate Justices of the United States Supreme Court: John Marshall Harlan II, Thurgood Marshall, and Sonia Sotomayor. Judge Learned Hand served on the court from 1924 to 1961, as did his cousin, Augustus Noble Hand, from 1927 until 1953. Judge Henry Friendly served from 1959 to 1986.

Current composition of the court 
:

List of former judges

Chief judges

Succession of seats

See also 
 Judicial appointment history for United States federal courts#Second Circuit
 List of current United States Circuit Judges

References

External links 

 United States Court of Appeals for the Second Circuit
 Recent opinions from FindLaw

 
New Haven, Connecticut
Brooklyn
Syracuse, New York
Hartford, Connecticut
1891 establishments in the United States
Courts and tribunals established in 1891